Pavlo Onysko (born 12 July 1979 in Lviv, Ukrainian SSR, Soviet Union) is a professional Ukrainian football player.

Onysko became a professional football player with FC Karpaty Lviv, and after going on loan to FC Obolon Kyiv to seek more first team football, he was acquired by Illichivets in early 2003. He played sparingly for Illichivets' first team and suffered a long-term injury which led the club to release him in early 2004.

References

External links

1979 births
Living people
Ukrainian footballers
FC Karpaty Lviv players
FC Lviv (1992) players
FC Obolon-Brovar Kyiv players
FC Mariupol players
FC Vorskla Poltava players
FC Prykarpattia Ivano-Frankivsk (2004) players
Association football forwards
Sportspeople from Lviv